Alasha (in some Mongolian varieties ; Mongolian script: , Mongolian Cyrillic: Алшаа), or , is a Mongolic variety with features of both Oirat and Mongolian that historically used to belong to Oirat but has come under the influence of Mongolian proper.

Phonology

 'small' vs.  'group', therefore . 'to thrust open' vs.  'to come', thus . The maximal syllable is CVCC, e.g.  converbal form of 'to counteract'''.

References

Literature

  (2005): 
 Söngrüb (1988):  In:  1. Beijing, : 160-197.
 Svantesson, Jan-Olof, Anna Tsendina, Anastasia Karlsson, Vivan Franzén (2005): The Phonology of Mongolian''. New York: Oxford University Press.

Central Mongolic languages